Burmester is an unincorporated community in northeastern Tooele County, Utah, United States.

Description

Burmester was originally settled as a railroad community under the name of Grants Station; in 1906 it was renamed for landowner Frank T. Burmester. The community severely declined during the Great Depression.

See also

References

External links

Unincorporated communities in Tooele County, Utah
Unincorporated communities in Utah